No Yeom-ju (born 15 June 1968) is a South Korean former cyclist. She attended , and represented her school at the 67th Korean National Sports Festival in 1986. She went on to study at Kyonggi University. She competed in the women's individual road race at the 1988 Summer Olympics.

References

1968 births
Living people
South Korean female cyclists
Olympic cyclists of South Korea
Cyclists at the 1988 Summer Olympics
Place of birth missing (living people)
Kyonggi University alumni
20th-century South Korean women
21st-century South Korean women